"Baby It's You" is a song by British R&B group MN8. It was released in October 1995 as the fourth single from their debut album, To the Next Level. It peaked at number 22 on the UK Singles Chart and at number 34 in New Zealand.

The track was also notably co written by Pam Sheyne

Track listings
 CD 1
 "Baby It's You" (OJI West Coast Mix) — 4:17
 "Happy" (Jodeci Mix) — 4:12
 "Baby It's You" (The Argonauts Club Mix) — 7:59
 "Baby It's You" (West London Mix) — 3:56

 CD 2
 "Baby It's You" (OJI West Coast Mix) — 4:17
 "If You Only Let Me In" (R&B Mix) — 4:27
 "I've Got a Little Something for You" (Smooth Remix) — 6:27
 "Lonely" — 4:38

 Cassette Single
 "Baby It's You" (OJI West Coast Mix) — 4:17
 "Happy" (Jodeci Mix) — 4:12

References 

MN8 songs
1995 songs